It Is Well: A Worship Album by Kutless, more commonly referred to as It Is Well, is the second worship album and sixth full-length album by the Christian rock band Kutless. It was released on October 20, 2009. The first single, "What Faith Can Do," has seen success on the Christian Adult Contemporary Chart, the Inspirational/Soft Rock Chart, and the Christian CHR (Pop) Chart. The album debuted at No. 2 on Billboard's Hot Christian Albums chart and No. 42 on the Billboard Top 200. Recently, they have released a music video for their hit song "What Faith Can Do."  The song "What Faith Can Do" charted at No. 19 on the Billboard Bubbling Under Hot 100 Singles chart. Musically, the album deviates away from the hard rock sound on their previous albums and features a softer, calmer tone.

Track listing

The deluxe edition of It Is Well features three live versions of songs from the album, one acoustic version and one new song.

Personnel 

Kutless
 Jon Micah Sumrall – lead and backing vocals 
 Nick De Partee – guitars, arrangements (1, 6, 10, 12)
 James Mead – guitars 
 Dave Lutkenhoelter – bass, arrangements (1)
 Jeff Gilbert – drums 

Additional musicians
 Dave Lubben – keyboards, acoustic piano, backing vocals 
 Matt Stanfield – keyboards (5)
 Brian Gocher – strings
 Luke Brown – backing vocals (5)
 Patrick Tetreault – backing vocals (7)
 Westside Christian High School Choir – choir 

Production

 Kutless – producers (1–4, 6–12), art direction, design 
 Dave Lubben – producer (1–4, 6–12)
 Brown Bannister – producer (5), engineer (5)
 Chance Hoag – executive producer, management 
 Tyson Paoletti – executive producer
 Steve Bishir – engineer
 Bill Whittington – engineer, digital editing
 John Bannister – digital editing (5)
 F. Reid Shippen – mixing (1–4, 6–12)
 J.R. McNeely – mixing (5)
 Buckley Miller – mix assistant 
 Troy Glessner – mastering 
 Meghann Street-Buswell – photography

Awards
In 2010, the album was nominated for a Dove Award for Rock/Contemporary Album of the Year at the 41st GMA Dove Awards.

References

Kutless albums
2009 albums
BEC Recordings albums
Tooth & Nail Records albums
Albums produced by Brown Bannister